Mario Giulio Fara was an Italian musicologist. He was the director of the Pesaro conservatory of music. In 1913-4 he published important studies on the music of Sardinia.

Italian musicologists
Year of birth missing
Year of death missing